The NSW AAGPS (Athletic Association of the Great Public Schools of New South Wales) is one of the premier basketball competitions played in Australia. It is an annual, 7 round competition played between 8 Sydney member teams that include Saint Ignatius Riverview, St Joseph's Hunters Hill, Sydney Grammar, Sydney Boys High, Newington College, Scots College, The Kings school and Sydney Church Of England (Shore). Preseason games are played in Term 4 of the particular season, with the official GPS games played in Term 1 every Saturday. 1st grade games commence at 11:15 and often attract large games. The 1st grade premiership is currently held by Sydney Church of England Grammar School (Shore) while the Rashcke cup is held by Newington College. In 2nd grade the premiership is held by St Ignatius College while the PJ Yeend Trophy is currently held by Sydney Church of England Grammar School (Shore).

Every season the AAGPS/RASHCKE Cup (all AAGPS schools compete) is played (formerly in a one-week before Round 1, in a 1-day round robin formatted competition) over the trial rounds, with the schools are separated into two pools, with the winner of each group playing each other in the final. This cup is the 2nd most prestigious accolade from a season. In near consecutive seasons of 2013, 2014, 2015, 2017, 2018 Saint Ignatius College Riverview have made the final, in which they have been victorious 4 times (13,15, 17, 18).

Commencement

The competition commenced in 1975.

 First Teams compete for the Denys Hake Shield which was first awarded in 1975, and was presented by The King's School Council in honour of the wife of a former Headmaster of King's, Herbert Denys Hake OBE.
 Second Teams compete for The TE Bawden Shield which was first awarded in 1975. It was also presented by The King's School and named after the first GPS Convenor of Basketball, and later GPS Treasurer, Tom Bawden.
 The AAGPS and CAS First Teams compete annually for the PJ Yeend Cup, presented by Basketball NSW.
 The AAGPS and ISA First Teams compete annually for the McKay Cup.

Competition format

Formerly a 14-round competition where each team plays each other twice, since 2013 the competition has been a 7-round format with each team playing each other once. The season begins in Term 4, where teams will play trial matches against a mix of AAGPS, ISA, and CAS teams, including 3 rounds of Raschke Cup/Yeend Shield, where a pre-season winner will be crowned.

Term 1 begins the competition games where schools play each other every Saturday, 10am for 2nd V and 11:15am for 1st V. If a team is able to win 7 games they will be crowned Undefeated Champions and earn the outright AAGPS title.

Results

1975 to 1999

2000 onwards

|- 
|2020
|Shore (undefeated AAGPS AND NSWCIS CHAMPIONS)
| St ignatius college, riverview
|}

Notable players
 Isaac Humphries (Scots) - University of Kentucky/Orlando Magic
 Nick Kay (Newington) - Metro State College/Perth Wildcats
 Jordan Hunter (Riverview) - St Mary's College/Sydney Kings
 Jackson Aldridge (Riverview) - Butler University
 Grant Anticevich (Newington) - University of California
 Greg MacQuillan (Riverview) - Undrafted
 Hunter Madden (Shore) - University of Idaho/Sydney Kings

See also 

 Athletic Association of the Great Public Schools of New South Wales
 AAGPS (NSW) Rugby
 AAGPS (NSW) Soccer
 Head of the River (New South Wales)

References

 GPS Results Archive

External links
 GPS website

Athletic Association of the Great Public Schools of New South Wales
Sport in New South Wales
Private schools in New South Wales
Sports competitions in Sydney